The list of shipwrecks in April 1823 includes all ships sunk, foundered, grounded, or otherwise lost during April 1823.

1 April

2 April

3 April

4 April

5 April

7 April

8 April

9 April

11 April

12 April

14 April

15 April

16 April

17 April

19 April

20 April

22 April

23 April

24 April

25 April

26 April

27 April

29 April

Unknown date

References

1823-04